Patrick Wymark (11 July 192620 October 1970) was an English stage, film and television actor.

Early life
Wymark was born Patrick Carl Cheeseman in Cleethorpes, Lincolnshire. He was brought up in neighbouring Grimsby and frequently revisited the area at the height of his career. He was educated at St Mary's Catholic School and Wintringham Boys' Grammar School in Grimsby, before joining the Royal Navy and serving as a midshipman in the Mediterranean. On leaving the navy, he received a government grant to study at University College London, where he read English and performed in the university's dramatic society.

Career
Wymark dropped out of university to train at the Bristol Old Vic Theatre School and making his first stage appearance in a walk-on part in Othello in 1951. He toured South Africa the following year and then directed plays for the drama department at Stanford University, California.

After moving to the Shakespeare Memorial Theatre in Stratford-upon-Avon, Wymark played a wide range of Shakespearean roles, including Dogberry in Much Ado About Nothing, Stephano in The Tempest, Marullus in Julius Caesar and Bottom in A Midsummer Night's Dream. Other stage credits included the title role in Danton's Death and, with the Royal Shakespeare Company (RSC), Ephihodov in The Cherry Orchard. His theatre roles also included Bosola in a RSC production of John Webster's The Duchess of Malfi in 1960.

In television, Wymark was best known for his role as the machiavellian businessman John Wilder in the twin drama series The Plane Makers and The Power Game (which were broadcast from 1963 to 1969), which led to offers of real company directorships and the British Academy Television Award for Best Actor in 1965. However, Wymark was a gentle person in real life and was, by his own admission, ignorant of business matters. He considered the character of Wilder a "bastard" and was described by his wife Olwen as "the most inefficient, dreamy muddler in the world." In the mid-1960s, Wymark was considered as the replacement for William Hartnell in the title role of Doctor Who.

Wymark's film appearances included: Children of the Damned (1964), Operation Crossbow (1965), Repulsion (1965), Where Eagles Dare (1968), Witchfinder General (1968), Battle of Britain (1969), Doppelgänger (1969), The Blood on Satan's Claw (1970) and Cromwell (1970)

Personal life

Wymark married American playwright Olwen Buck (known as Olwen Wymark) in 1953; the couple met while both were students at University College, London. He took his acting name from his wife's paternal grandfather, the writer William Wymark Jacobs. The couple lived near Parliament Hill in Hampstead, London, and had four children, including the future actress Jane Wymark. Wymark died suddenly in Melbourne, Australia on 20 October 1970, aged 44, of a heart attack in his hotel room. He had been due to star in the play  Sleuth at the Comedy Theatre three days later. On the night of his death, he was to appear on the TV variety programme In Melbourne Tonight. He, guest Richard Deacon and host Stuart Wagstaff had just appeared together in a TV production of Hans Christian Andersen stories and his non-appearance led to several jokes by Wagstaff and Deacon. Host Wagstaff was informed of Wymark's death mid-way through the programme and announced it at the end. He was buried at Highgate Cemetery in London. Wymark View—located in his home town, Grimsby—is named after him.

Selected filmography
 The League of Gentlemen (1960) as Wylie
 The Criminal (1960) as Sol
 West 11 (1963) as Father Hogan
 Dr. Syn, Alias the Scarecrow (1963) as Joseph Ransley
 Children of the Damned (1964) as Commander 
 The Secret of Blood Island (1964) as Major Jocomo
 Operation Crossbow (1965) as Prime Minister Winston Churchill
 Repulsion (1965) as Landlord 
 The Skull (1965) as Marco
 The Psychopath (1966) as Inspector Holloway
 Woman Times Seven (1967) as Henri (segment "At The Opera")
 Tell Me Lies (1968) as Guest
 Witchfinder General (1968) as Cromwell
 Where Eagles Dare (1968) as Colonel Wyatt Turner
 Doppelgänger (1969) (alternative title: Journey to the Far Side of the Sun) as Jason Webb
 Battle of Britain (1969) as Air Vice Marshal Trafford Leigh-Mallory
 Cromwell (1970) as The Earl of Strafford
 The Blood on Satan's Claw (1970) as The Judge
  (1972) as Christian Holm (final film role)

References

External links

1926 births
1970 deaths
20th-century English male actors
Male actors from Lincolnshire
Alumni of University College London
Alumni of Bristol Old Vic Theatre School
Best Actor BAFTA Award (television) winners
Burials at Highgate Cemetery
English male film actors
English male stage actors
English male television actors
English people of Finnish descent
English theatre directors
People from Cleethorpes
People from Grimsby
Royal Navy personnel of World War II
Royal Shakespeare Company members
English Roman Catholics